Catatonia is a medical condition characterized by immobility and unresponsiveness.

Catatonia may also refer to:
Catatonia (band), a Welsh rock band
Katatonia, a Swedish metal band
"Catatonic" (song), a song by Babes in Toyland
"Catatonia", a song by the Amity Affliction from the album Everyone Loves You... Once You Leave Them